Solliden Palace -- commonly known as just Solliden -- is the summer residence of the Swedish Royal Family and the personal private property of King Carl XVI Gustaf. The palace is situated near the Borgholm Castle ruin on the island of Öland in southern Sweden along its Baltic coast. The Royal Family uses the palace for celebrating Victoriadagen.

References

External links
 Official website

Castles in Kalmar County
Royal residences in Sweden